Staniland is a surname. Notable people with the surname include:

 Andrew Staniland (born 1977), Canadian composer and guitarist
 Chris Staniland (1905–1942), British test pilot
 Meaburn Staniland (1809–1898), British solicitor and politician
 Ted Staniland (1874–1917), Australian rules footballer